Zhang Ying (born 15 April 1996) is a professional Chinese tennis player.

On 6 March 2017, she reached her highest WTA singles ranking of 356. On 10 April 2017, Zhang peaked at No. 253 in the WTA doubles rankings. She has won two singles and six doubles titles on tournaments of the ITF Circuit.

Zhang made her WTA Tour main-draw debut at the 2015 Guangzhou International Open, in the doubles competition partnering Ankita Raina.

ITF Circuit finals

Singles: 2 (2 titles)

Doubles: 15 (6 titles, 9 runner–ups)

References

External links
 
 

1996 births
Living people
Chinese female tennis players
21st-century Chinese women